Ruhwa is a town in western Rwanda.

Location
The coordinates of Ruhwa, Rwanda are:2°43'52.0"S, 29°02'29.0"E (Latitude:-2.731111; Longitude:29.041389).

Population
The population of Ruhwa, Rwanda is not publicly known at this time.

Points of interest
The most important point of interest is the international border crossing between Rwanda and Burundi along Highway RN5. The border crossing maintains a one-stop border stop.

See also

References

External links
 Ruhwa Micro Hydro Power Project

Rusizi District
Western Province, Rwanda
Populated places in Rwanda